Shawn Milne (born November 9, 1981) is a professional road bicycle racer from Gloucester, Massachusetts, United States. On May 31, 2009, he won the Air Force Cycling Classic. He was selected to represent the United States at the 2002 and 2003 Under 23 World Road Race Championships.

Milne was a member of the 2000 Gloucester High School (Massachusetts) national champion and national record-setting indoor track distance medley relay team along with Josh Palazola, Tristan Colangelo and Ngai Otieno.

Major results 

2001
 1st, KOM Classification – Fitchburg-Longsjo Classic
 1st, Naugatuck Criterium (USA)
 3rd, Palmer Road Race (USA)
 3rd, Cloudsplitter Classic Criterium (USA)
2002
 3rd, Four Bridges of Elgin (USA)
2003 – U.S. National Team
2004 – Fiordifrutta
 1st, Stage 6 – Volta Ciclista Internacional a Lleida (ESP)
2005 – Fiordifrutta
 1st, Stage 3 – Nature Valley Grand Prix Stage Race (USA)
2006 – 
 1st, Univest Grand Prix (USA) UCI 1.2
 1st, Overall GC – Fitchburg Longsjo Classic (USA)
 1st, Stages 2 and 3 – Fitchburg Longsjo Classic (USA)
 1st, Presbyterian Hospital Invitational Criterium
2007 – 
 1st, Stage 1, Tour de Taiwan (UCI Asia Tour/UCI 2.2)
 1st, Overall GC – Tour de Taiwan (UCI Asia Tour/UCI 2.2)
2008 – 
2009
1st Crystal Cup
2012 – 
 Massachusetts State Criterium Champion

References

Living people
1981 births
American male cyclists